The GM "old-look" transit bus was a transit bus that was introduced in 1940 by Yellow Coach beginning with the production of the model TG-3201  bus.  Yellow Coach was an early bus builder that was partially owned by General Motors (GM) before being purchased outright in 1943 and folded into the GM Truck Division to form the GM Truck & Coach Division. The Yellow Coach badge gave way to the GM nameplate in 1944. Production of most "old-look" models was stopped upon the release of the GM New-Look bus in 1959, however some smaller "old-look" models continued to be built until 1969. Approximately 38,000 "old-look" buses were built during the 29-year production run.  The "old-look" name is an unofficial retronym applied to this series of GM buses after the release of the GM New-Look series.

Design
The GM "old-look" bus was somewhat streamlined in appearance (resembling the PCC streetcar in styling), similar in shape to a loaf of sandwich bread, and had windows that were smaller than those found on more modern bus designs produced after the 1950s. Unlike most earlier buses, the GM "old-look" bus was built using a monocoque design, rather than a body-on-frame design, and it helped shepherd the change from gasoline to diesel-powered buses. Most "old-look" buses were powered with the Detroit Diesel 6-71 inline six-cylinder diesel engine, the exceptions being the shorter models that were powered by the Detroit Diesel 4-71, a four-cylinder version of the same diesel engine, and buses that were equipped with gasoline engines. 

Manual and automatic transmissions were available. Before 1948, the Spicer angle-drive two-speed transmission was equipped as the automatic transmission. After 1948, the 2-speed Allison V-drive transmission was used. In 1940 and 1942, a small number of buses were built with electric propulsion systems instead of a transmission.

In 1946 GM began offering its Thermo-matic heating and ventilation system, and in 1952 started making suburban models, which can be identified by larger passenger windows, high-backed forward-facing seats, and optional luggage racks.  Beginning in 1953, air-ride suspension became standard on all but the smallest model buses, and in 1958, air conditioning was added as an available option.

In 1959, GM introduced its New-Look bus with the "fishbowl" style front window, and production stopped on all "old-look" buses other than the "second-generation" models: the  TGH-3102 which was built until 1963 and the  35xx models which were built until 1969.

Turbo-Cruiser I
However, the brake-specific fuel consumption of the GT-300 was 1.63 lb/hp·h, approximately double the consumption of a comparable diesel engine; the subsequent GT-304 included a regenerator and fuel consumption decreased by half to 0.77 lb/hp·h. At the time, W.A. Turunen, the head of gas turbine research at GM, cited consumption, acceleration lag, and lack of engine braking as the main faults. The GM gas turbine engine later was fitted more famously to the Firebird I/XP-21 concept car in 1954.

When newer "Turbo-Cruiser" buses were developed in the 1960s using New Look buses, chassis TDH-4512/0002 was redesignated "Turbo-Cruiser I"; this bus was converted back to diesel power and sold to Martin Lines in 1963.

Model designations
The model designations used for GM "old-look" buses consisted of a series of two or three letters followed by a series of four numbers (for example, TDH-4512). The letters and numbers gave a basic description of the type of bus as follows:

Production
The following buses are listed by ascending model number. All buses are 96 inches wide unless noted. Note that Yellow Coach realigned all models to series 05 in 1941.

Soviet versions

ZIS-154

Following World War II, cities in the Soviet Union needed a modern transit bus. Agreement was reached to build GM's model TDH-3610 under license (but with diesel-electric propulsion, similar to that used for the TDE-40xx models), and production was assigned to ZIS (Zavod imeni Stalina: literally Plant named after Stalin) where it became their model number 154. The ZIS-154 was first assembled with a locally manufactured Yaroslavl YaAZ-204 diesel, but supply problems caused ZIS to switch to the Detroit Diesel 6-71, also built under license. Continuing issues with the reliability of the drive-train components resulted in the ZIS-154 being discontinued after only slightly more than four years of production and 1,165 units.

In some places these buses were nicknamed "lightning" because of the rapid acceleration provided by the diesel-electric drive.

ZIS-155

In an attempt to overcome the problems of the ZIS-154, the less-technically-advanced ZIS-155 was designed.  In 1949 Moscow's Central Auto Repair Workshop (ЦАРМ: Центральные авторемонтные мастерские) constructed a batch of shortened ZIS-154 bodies and mounted them on modified ZIS-150 truck chassis. One source suggests that the "Moscow" prototypes had shrouds over the rear wheels, a more-stylized front wheel cut-out, and a larger radiator. The prototypes were successful, and full-scale production began at ZIS.

The most noticeable difference between the ZIS-154 and the ZIS-155 was the placement of the doors: since the ZIS-155 had a front engine, the doors were moved to behind the axles. The driver's compartment was completely separated from the passenger saloon by a bulkhead, so the buses were two-man operated, with a rear entrance and front exit. The 154 employed unibody construction, while the 155 was body-on-frame.

Besides being the standard city bus in the Soviet Union in the 1950s, a large quantity were exported to other Eastern Bloc countries, and are known to have been used in Warsaw, Berlin, Ulan Bator and Beijing. A twelve-seat long-distance version was also built. In Moscow a number of withdrawn units were rebuilt as trailers, but they were not a success as the ZIS-155 was underpowered and therefore had difficulty pulling a fully loaded trailer, too.

From 1955 the ZIS-155 was equipped with an alternator instead of a generator, the first Soviet bus to be so equipped. After destalinization began in 1956 under Khrushchev's leadership, the ZIS plant was renamed in 1956 to Zavod Imeni Likhacheva (ZIL), after its former director Ivan Alekseevich Likhachev. As a result, late-production 155s were designated as ZIL-155.

MTB-82 trolleybus

in German
MTB-82 (German Wikipedia: MTB-82);  English translation

See also

United States
Yellow Coach - original manufacturer of the "old-look" transit bus
GM New Look bus - next generation bus

Competing bus manufacturers
ACF-Brill
Flxible
Mack Trucks
Twin Coach
White Motor Company

Soviet Union
Trolleybuses in former Soviet Union countries
in Russian
ЗИС-154 (Russian Wikipedia: ZIS-154); English translation
ЗИС-155 (Russian Wikipedia: ZIS-155); English translation

References

Bibliography
Stauss, Ed (1988). The Bus World Encyclopedia of Buses, Woodland Hills, CA: Stauss Publications. .
Luke, William A. & Metler, Linda L. (2005). City Transit Buses of the 20th Century, Hudson, WI: Iconografix. .
McKane, John H. & Squier, Gerald L. (2006). Welcome Aboard the GM New Look Bus, Hudson, WI: Iconografix. .

External links
U.S.A.
Ohio Museum of Transportation, omot.org, retrieved on 2006-12-20.
The Antique Motor Coach Association of Pennsylvania, amcap.org, retrieved on 2006-12-22.
Coachbuilt.com - General Motors Corporation, coachbuilt.com, retrieved on 2006-12-20.
The Bus Spot, members.aol.com, retrieved on 2006-12-22.
Coach Information Network , coachinfo.com, retrieved on 2006-12-23.

U.S.S.R.
Zis 155 (Moscow Museum of Passenger Transport: Autobus); English translation
ZIS-154 - Soviet Old Look bus (in Russian) English translation
Official AMO ZiL Site: History
Oldtimer picture gallery: Trucks: ZiS

Buses of the United States
Transit bus
Vehicles introduced in 1940
Full-size buses